Bisvertinolone is an anticancer metabolite of Trichoderma.

Notes

Trichoderma
Oxygen heterocycles
Heterocyclic compounds with 3 rings
Ketones